The 1907 NYU Violets football team was an American football team that represented New York University as an independent during the 1907 college football season. In their first year under head coach Herman Olcott, the team compiled a 5–2 record.

Schedule

Regular season

Scrimmage games

References

NYU
NYU Violets football seasons
NYU Violets football